AW Rostamani Group, also known as “AWR”, is a privately held company established in 1954 in Dubai, United Arab Emirates, by Al Rostamani brothers, Abdullah and Abdul Wahid Al Rostamani. The company is headquartered in Dubai and employs over 3,800 workers. The Group operates 12 companies in seven diverse sectors: automotive, real estate, retail, lighting, travel and logistics.

History

AW Rostamani began in 1951 when Abdul Wahid and his brother Abdullah Hassan Al Rostamani, two sons of a local pearl trader, took the decision to set up a family business on the shore of the Dubai Creek. Inspired by their passion for reading, the Al Rostamani brothers opened Dubai's first bookshop, Al Ahliya Library, in 1954, importing much sought after books from Egypt, Syria, and Lebanon by Gulf Air through Bahrain. Currently, the AW Rostamani Group is a conglomerate of 14 diversified companies.

Milestones

1954 Abdul Wahid Al Rostamani and his brother Abdullah opened Al-Ahliya Library, Dubai's first bookstore.
1957 General Trading company is established.
1968 Arabian Automobiles is established, an automotive and car dealership company.
1979 AW Rostamani Building Industries, a provider of services for the architectural and interior fit-out markets, is launched.
1981 Al Rostamani Real Estate is established to offer property development, leasing and asset management.
1982 Arabian Automobiles enters into partnership with INFINITI, Real Estate is established to offer property development, leasing and asset management services
1996 Sponsored the first Dubai Shopping Festival and its entertainment -Aqua Fantasia, a water themed fireworks show.
1998 AW Rostamani Logistics, a global logistics service provider, is established. AW Rostamani Lumina, manufacturer of luminaires and lighting control equipment, is launched Certified Quality Cars is established, subsequently renamed as Certified Pre Owned.
1999 AW Rostamani Lumina forms partnership with Spanish lighting brand, Frater.
2004 Start of partnership with Oracle.
2005 Arabian Automobiles enters a partnership with Renault.
2006 AW Rostamani Shift Technologies, an IT and business consulting firm, is established.
2007 AW Rostamani Group brand is established.
2008 AW Rostamani Shift Car Rental is established. AW Rostamani Excellencors, a consulting and training firm, is established.
2009 AW Rostamani Trading, distributor of various allied automotive products and services, is established.
2010 AW Rostamani Group enters the Indian market as Prime Honda AW Rostamani Trading enters Saudi Arabia as the distributor of ZNA cars and genuine ZNA parts.
2011 AW Rostamani Arabian Automobiles is the first automotive company in the region to implement a Customer Loyalty Program (Nissan Road Miles). AW Rostamani Trading appointed as the sole distributor of ZNA cars and genuine ZNA parts in Oman. AW Rostamani enters a partnership with KAR Freight & Forwarding to provide global customised and integrated logistics services.
2015 GE Lighting signs a partnership agreement with AW Rostamani Lumina.
2016 AW Rostamani Lifestyle expands retail stores with the launch of Georg Jensen, Graffiti Fashion Zone and Apartment 51.
2017 AW Rostamani sets up shop for multi brand secondhand cars.
2018 AW Rostamani acquires a majority stake in car retailer Brayleys.
2019 Hilton signs an agreement with AW Rostamani Group to develop a DoubleTree by Hilton hotel in Bur Dubai.

Key People
Khalid Abdul Wahid Al Rostamani is the Chairman of AW Rostamani. He started his career with the family group in 1993. Since then, he has been involved in managing and growing the diverse portfolio of companies under AW Rostamani. In addition to his management functions, Khalid manages AW Rostamani's corporate functions and corporate governance structures.

Huda Al Rostamani is the Managing Director and board member of AW Rostamani since 2007. She is the performance manager of the lifestyle companies under AW Rostamani Group.

Amina Al Rostamani is the Director and Board Member of AW Rostamani Group, and the Chief Executive Officer of AWR Properties. Previously group CEO of TECOM group, she is also currently a Board Member of Dubai Healthcare City Authority and Noor Bank.

Since 1990 Michel Ayat heads the Automotive division of AW Rostamani that consists of Arabian Automobiles, AW Rostamani Trading, Certified Pre-owned and Shift Car Rental.

Group Companies

AWR Properties

AWR Properties has developed a portfolio of property since 1982. The Real Estate arm of the Group is split into Property Development, Leasing and Facilities Management of both commercial and residential units alongside retail. The real estate branch of the company handles over 2.5 Million sq. ft. of residential and commercial space in the UAE.  It is responsible for the development of the 21st Century Tower on Sheikh Zayed Road and the AW Rostamani head office building in Deira. Al Rostamani Properties residential towers include the 21st Century Tower, which was previously named the tallest residential tower in the world, DXB Tower and Al Mada Tower. Other properties include the Jaddaf Views, and Trio which comprises three connected apartments. The Real Estate subsidiary of the Group has an integrated approach, from sourcing the site to placing a tenant in the residence.
The Group maintains its diverse range of retail and commercial assets across Dubai and the Northern Emirates.

The new addition, Mankhool AWR Properties, comprises 327 hotel rooms, ten floors of commercial offices and 182 units of residential rooms. Established properties in the commercial division include vehicle sales showrooms for Nissan, INFINITI and Renault.

AWR Properties manages all its internal operations, from the point of origin to the point of delivery. For the logistics requirements of the diverse departments in the Group, there are multiple warehouses, offices, business centres, labour camps and showrooms.

Arabian Automobiles
Established in 1968, and are the exclusive distributors of Nissan, INFINITI, and Renault,  in Dubai, and the Northern Emirates. The company operates a large network of showrooms, service centers, spare parts outlets and a "certified pre-owned division" across Dubai. The network includes 13 Nissan showrooms, 6 INFINITI Centres, 4 Renault showrooms, 6 used car facilities, 16 service centres, 14 spare parts outlets, and 1 24 hour service center. Renault vehicles include electrical cars Zoe, Twizzy and Kangoo.

Prime Honda
A wholly owned subsidiary of the AW Rostamani Group, Prime Honda is the authorised Honda dealer in India. Recognition received include Gold in the World Skill Contest, the All India Technician Contest (DT & BT category), Prime Honda Capital Cars Pvt. Ltd. Parts Excellence Award and in 2016, the Best Inventory Management (Parts) and Winner of all India highest Certification (Auto Terrace).

AW Rostamani Trading
AW Rostamani Trading, an ISO 9001:2008 certified company, with brands such as TOTAL lubricants, Ceat Tyres, Sava Tyres, Amaron batteries, Fortron Automotive Treatments and XCool heat control films in the UAE. One of the strategic units within the Group, AW Rostamani Trading diversifies its automotive services by offering allied products and services.

Shift Car Rental
The fleet currently stands at 8,000 vehicles,  supplies Nissan, INFINITI and Renault models on short and long-term lease.

AUTOTRUST
AUTOTRUST is a multi-brand car service company in the UAE that provides repair, service, and sales of certified pre-owned cars. The company operates  three workshops, located in Abu Dhabi, Dubai and Sharjah. AUTOTRUST offers integrated multi-brand vehicle care, protection and sales options.

Brayleys
AW Rostamani acquired a majority stake in Brayleys, the London and South East England car retailer, for an undisclosed sum in November 2018. This is the company's first investment in the UK's motor retail sector.

AW Rostamani Lifestyle

AW Rostamani Lifestyle, started in the year 2012. AW Rostamani Lifestyle are into fashion, jewelry and homeware sectors regionally, with a portfolio that includes international and regional brands such as Georg Jensen, Graffiti, Vhernier, Angels, Apartment 51 and American Rag.

AW Rostamani Lifestyle is the Vhernier brand agent in the UAE. Established in 1984, Vhernier is an Italian jewellery store. It is a high-end Italian brand, renowned for its contemporary and unconventional jewellery.

Launched in Dubai Mall in 2015, Graffiti is a kid's fashion store.

Angels is a designer children's-wear chain with 4 stores in Dubai. They are a multi-brand kids wear concept specializing in luxury garments and accessories for boys and girls.  The portfolio consists of brands from French and Italian design houses such as Burberry, Kenzo, Fendi and others.

Georg Jensen A/S (originally Georg Jensens Sølvsmedie A/S) is a Danish designer company with focus on silverware. It was founded by famed silversmith Georg Jensen in 1904. Georg Jensen first store in the UAE was opened in April 2016 at City Walk, Dubai.

American lifestyle multi-brand retail American Rag Cie opened in Dubai Mall in September 2018. The brand's Dubai venture is in partnership with AW Rostamani Lifestyle, exclusive licensee for the MENA region. The store was established in 1984 in LA Brea, Los Angeles. Brands available includes Carven, Stine Goya, Paige, Levi's and Puma for women, and Barena Milano, Editions Mr, Kappa, Needles and BALR for men.

The Apartment 51 brand is a concept store in Dubai. The available 36 brands at Apartment51 online store are mainly European brands such as Baci, Historia and Riviere.

KAR Freight, Forwarding & Transport
Formed in 2012, KAR Transport is a land transportation service provider based in Dubai that manages the national and regional supply chain operations for Arabian Automobiles and AW Rostamani Trading. Operating principally in the UAE and the GCC, KAR Transport maintains a network of international partners across the Middle Eastern countries. Currently operate a modern fleet of over one hundred trucks and purpose-built trailers.

AWR Lumina
Incorporated in 1999, AWR Lumina is a provider of lighting products in UAE. AW Rostamani Lumina delivers lighting products to largescale hospitality, retail and commercial developments with presence in 22 countries across Africa, Middle East, and Asia. Brand partners include GE Lighting, Philips, Koledo, Dyna Light, Britop, Tridonic, Floss, Tryka, Leviton, Opple and Eaton Cooper.

CSR
AW Rostamani officially launched its corporate social responsibility platform in 2018, Enriching Communities, with the aim to give back. Employees have volunteered to a range of causes, including a visit to Dubai Autism Center and collaborating with Zayed University to support students of determination.

Awards and honors

References

Companies based in Dubai
Privately held companies of the United Arab Emirates
Conglomerate companies established in 1954
Conglomerate companies of the United Arab Emirates